Gökkaya may refer to:

 Gökkaya, Kemah, a village in the Kemah District of Erzincan Province, Turkey
 Gökkaya, Ortaköy, a village in the District of Ortaköy, Aksaray Province, Turkey